Linköpings Allmänna Simsällskap is one of the oldest Swedish swim teams, founded on 4 June 1824. It is one of the best-known Swedish swimming teams. The head coach for the swim team is Niklas Larsson.

Swimmers
Erik Andersson (2006–present)
Lars Frölander (2001–present): Olympic gold medal winner, 100 m butterfly
Marcus Piehl

External links
LASS's official homepage 

Swimming clubs in Sweden
1824 establishments in Sweden
Sports clubs established in the 1820s
Sport in Östergötland County
Clubs and societies in Sweden